Mohammed Haji-Ali Shirwa (13 October 1937 – 9 November 2009), a son of former Somali seamen and the brother of Omar Haji Ali, a former Somali diplomat, was a former colonel in the Somali Army and poet who collected the works of many Somali and North Somali poets by writing and saving for generations to come, however his books are yet to published, as he died 9 November 2009 in Amsterdam, where he lived and had acquired Dutch citizenship.

Colonel Mohammed Haji Ali was born in 1937 at Durduri town east of Laasqoray on the Red Sea coast, his early years grew up in Laasqoray were his dad, Haji-Ali, returned to after World War I in which he participated in England.

After World War II, Young Mohammed went to live in Aden, Yemen, where he studied and finished his secondary education and then joined the Police forces in Aden.

Colonel Mohammed returned to his native Somalia after the Somali independence and union in 1964 and straight away joined the new Somali National Army. After the coup in Somalia in 1969, Colonel Mohammed has been sent to the Iraq and the United States for further study in military training.

Colonel Mohammed was injured in the Ogaden War of 1977-78 when his soldiers went to attack the strategic town of Godey. After the war he retired due to his injuries and worked for the (now abolished) Somali National Security Services for a number of years and then he retired from it and went to Business as he imported raw material for building in Mogadishu until the civil war started in Somalia's capital in late 1990.

Colonel Mohammed has recently returned to his Native region in North Somalia and he allocated himself at Garowe, the capital of Puntland State.

in early 2009, Colonel Mohammed has been asked by the new president of Puntland, Abdirahman Farole, to chair the seven-member military committee who were responsible of re-organising Puntland's police, and the rest of the security forces in Puntland.

Colonel Mohammed was one of the few former Somali senior army commanders who refused to be dragged into civil war and he fled the country to Syria where he became the leader of the new arrived Somali Community.

Late in the 1990s he arrived in the Netherlands' most populous city of Amsterdam were once again established a community centre for Somalis and he was honorary chairman for that centre until he died in Amsterdam on 9 November 2009. After his death, many well known figures have sent their condolences to the family of late Mohammed Haji-Ali amongst them was the Amir of Kuwait, Amir Sabah IV Al-Ahmad Al-Jaber Al-Sabah.

Colonel Mohammed left behind 15 children and many grand children.

References

LaasqorayNET

2009 deaths
Ethnic Somali people
1937 births